Piedrabuena is a municipality in Ciudad Real, Castile-La Mancha, Spain. It has a population of 4,759.

External links

Ayuntamiento de Piedrabuena
Mi Piedrabuena

Municipalities in the Province of Ciudad Real